Calopogonium mucunoides, called calopo and wild ground nut, is a species of flowering plant in the family Fabaceae, native to the New World Tropics, and introduced as a forage crop and a green manure to the tropics of Africa, Madagascar, the Indian Subcontinent, Asia, Malesia, Papuasia, and Australia. In some locales it has become a serious invasive species.

References

Phaseoleae
Flora of Mexico
Flora of Central America
Flora of the Dominican Republic
Flora of the Leeward Islands
Flora of the Windward Islands
Flora of northern South America
Flora of western South America
Flora of Brazil
Flora of Northeast Argentina
Plants described in 1826
Flora without expected TNC conservation status